Thittuvilai is a town in Kanyakumari district of Tamil Nadu state, India.

References

External links 
http://www.veethi.com/thittuvilai/PL12587
http://wikimapia.org/6534143/Thittuvilai
Census of India 2001: "Data from the 2001 Census, including cities, villages and towns (Provisional)". Census Commission of India. Archived from the original on 2004-06-16. Retrieved 2008-11-01.
http://trb.tn.nic.in/TET2013/16062013/Kanyakumari.pdf

Cities and towns in Kanyakumari district